Daniel Cameron (born 9 November 1953) is a Scottish footballer who played as a left back in the Football League.

References

External links

1953 births
Living people
Scottish footballers
Footballers from Dundee
Association football fullbacks
Sheffield Wednesday F.C. players
Colchester United F.C. players
Preston North End F.C. players
Dundee F.C. players
English Football League players
Scottish Football League players
Hellenic F.C. players
Scottish expatriate footballers
Expatriate soccer players in South Africa
Scottish expatriate sportspeople in South Africa